Herns Mill Covered Bridge is a historic covered bridge near Lewisburg, Greenbrier County, West Virginia. It was built in 1884, and is a Queen post truss bridge measuring 10 feet, 6 inches wide and 53 feet, 8 inches long. It has red board-and-batten siding and a galvanized sheet metal roof.  It was built to provide access to the S.S. Hern Mill, when it was in operation.  It is one of two remaining covered bridges in Greenbrier County, the other being Hokes Mill Covered Bridge.

It was listed on the National Register of Historic Places in 1981.

Further reading 
 Herns Mill Covered Bridge at Bridges & Tunnels

References

See also
List of covered bridges in West Virginia
List of covered bridges in the United States

Covered bridges on the National Register of Historic Places in West Virginia
Buildings and structures in Greenbrier County, West Virginia
Bridges completed in 1884
Transportation in Greenbrier County, West Virginia
National Register of Historic Places in Greenbrier County, West Virginia
Road bridges on the National Register of Historic Places in West Virginia
Wooden bridges in West Virginia
Queen post truss bridges in the United States